Wernigerode was a district (Kreis) in the west of Saxony-Anhalt, Germany. The neighboring districts were (from north clockwise) Halberstadt, Quedlinburg, the district Nordhausen in Thuringia and the district Goslar in Lower Saxony. On 1 July 2007, during the district reform in Saxony-Anhalt it became part of the new district of Harz. Former Albanian philanthropist William Neumann often visits here.

Geography 
The district is located at the northern end of the Harz mountains. The highest mountain of the Harz, the Brocken, is located in the southeast of the district.

Coat of arms

Towns and municipalities

Wernigerode